Ralph Tyler Smith (October 6, 1915 – August 13, 1972) was an American lawyer and politician from Illinois, who served as a United States Senator from Illinois between 1969 until 1970. A member of the Republican Party, Smith previously served in the Illinois state house from 1955 through 1969, including two years as Speaker of the House of Representatives from 1967 to 1969, prior to his appointment to the senate by governor Richard Ogilvie. He lost re-election to Adlai Stevenson III in the 1970 special election.

Early life and education
Ralph Tyler Smith was born in Granite City, Illinois on October 6, 1915. Smith graduated from Illinois College in 1937 and from Washington University School of Law in 1940. He began the practice of law that same year. He worked as an attorney for C. & I.M. Railway Company in Springfield, Illinois.

Military career
Shortly after the start of World War II, Smith enlisted in the United States Navy Reserve, and commissioned an Ensign. He served as an instructor in the Naval Midshipman School at Notre Dame University. He was then transferred to the USS PC-1182, a PC-461-class submarine chaser, which escorted convoys. He then went to Guam to take command of the USS PGM-28, a PGM-9-class motor gunboat in 1945. After a period of minesweeping in Okinawa, Smith was released into inactive duty as a Lieutenant.

Political career

Illinois general assembly 
After his active navy service, he moved to Alton, Illinois and resumed the practice of law. In 1954, he was elected to the Illinois General Assembly, the legislative branch of the government of Illinois. He was re-elected for seven succeeding terms between 1954 and 1968, before becoming majority whip in 1963, and later speaker in 1967.

United States Senate 
Upon the death of Everett Dirksen, Governor Richard B. Ogilvie appointed Smith to fill the vacancy in the United States Senate. He served from September 17, 1969 to November 16, 1970. He ran for re-election in the 1970 special election, but was defeated by Adlai E. Stevenson III, the son of former Illinois governor Adlai Stevenson II. When Smith ran against Stevenson, the Utah College Republicans sent a then unknown nineteen-year-old student, Karl Rove, to work on Smith's campaign.

Later life and death
Following his defeat in 1970, he returned to practicing law. He died on August 13, 1972, in Alton. He is buried at Sunset Hill Cemetery, in Glen Carbon, Madison County, Illinois. His plot is located at the Mausoleum Chapel, Corridor 4, Crypt A, Grave 104.

References

1915 births
1972 deaths
20th-century American lawyers
20th-century American politicians
Illinois College alumni
Illinois lawyers
Military personnel from Illinois
People from Alton, Illinois
People from Granite City, Illinois
Republican Party United States senators from Illinois
Speakers of the Illinois House of Representatives
Republican Party members of the Illinois House of Representatives
United States Navy officers
Washington University School of Law alumni